Mikko Haaparanta (born September 7, 1997) is a Finnish professional ice hockey forward currently playing for Ketterä of Mestis.

On December 17, 2018, Haaparanta was loaned to SaiPa of Liiga. He played five games for SaiPa and scored no points.

References

External links

1997 births
Living people
Finnish ice hockey forwards
Imatran Ketterä players
People from Imatra
SaiPa players
Sportspeople from South Karelia